Des and Dawn Lindberg were a South African husband and wife folk musical group who won a SARIE award in 1971 and 1973 for best vocal group.

Their first album, Folk on Trek was banned by the Apartheid government.

Their song, The Seagull's Name Was Nelson entered the charts at Number 8 in June 1971, reaching number 4 and spending twelve weeks on the charts.

Dawn died of COVID-19 related illness in 2020.

Discography

Albums

Singles

Compilations

References

1967 establishments in South Africa
2020 disestablishments in South Africa
South African folk musicians
Musical groups established in 1967
Musical groups disestablished in 2020